The economy of Suriname was largely dependent upon the exports of aluminium oxide and small amounts of aluminium produced from bauxite mined in the country. However, after the departure of Alcoa, the economy depended on the exports of crude oil and gold. Suriname was ranked the 124th safest investment destination in the world in the March 2011 Euromoney Country Risk rankings.

Agriculture 
In 2018, Suriname produced 273 thousand tons of rice, 125 thousand tons of sugar cane, in addition to smaller productions of other agricultural products, such as banana (48 thousand tons), orange (19 thousand tons) and coconut (14 thousand tons).

Foreign aid 
After the return to a more or less democratically elected government in 1991, Dutch aid resumed. The Dutch relationship continues to be an important factor in the economy, with the Dutch insisting that Suriname undertake economic reforms and produce specific plans acceptable to the Dutch for projects on which aid funds could be spent. In 2000, however, the Dutch revised the structure of their aid package and signaled to the Surinamese authorities their decision to disburse aid by sectoral priorities as opposed to individual projects. Although the present government is not in favor of this approach, it has identified sectors and is now working on sectoral analyses to present to the Dutch.

After a short respite in 1991–1996, when measures taken in 1993 led to economic stabilization, a relatively stable exchange rate, low inflation, sustainable fiscal policies, and growth, Suriname's economic situation deteriorated from 1996 to the present. This was due in large part to loose fiscal policies of the Wijdenbosch government, which, in the face of lower Dutch development aid, financed its deficit through credit extended by the central bank. As a consequence, the parallel market for foreign exchange soared so that by the end of 1998, the premium of the parallel market rate over the official rate was 85%. Since over 90% of import transactions took place at the parallel rate, inflation took off, with 12-month inflation growing from 0.5% at the end of 1996, to 23% at the end of 1998, and 113% at the end of 1999. The government also instituted a regime of stringent economic controls over prices, the exchange rate, imports, and exports, in an effort to contain the adverse efforts of its economic policies. The cumulative impact of soaring inflation, an unstable exchange rate, and falling real incomes led to a political crisis.

Dutch aid stopped to a large extent after Dési Bouterse was elected president. Aid from China has increased.

Mineral industry

Bauxite 
The backbone of Suriname's economy was the export of aluminium oxide (alumina) and small amounts of aluminium produced from bauxite mined in the country. In 1999, the aluminium smelter at Paranam was closed and mining at Onverdacht ceased; however, alumina exports accounted for 72% of Suriname's estimated export earnings of US$496.6 million in 2001. Suriname's bauxite deposits have been among the world's richest.

Inexpensive power costs are Suriname's big advantage in the energy-intensive alumina and aluminium business. In the 1960s, the Aluminum Company of America (Alcoa) built the US$150-million Afobaka Dam for the production of hydroelectric energy. This created the Brokopondo Reservoir a 1,560 km2 lake, one of the largest artificial lakes in the world.

West Suriname Plan

In 1976–1977, a 100 km long single track railway was constructed by Morrison-Knudsen in West Suriname from the bauxite containing Bakhuis Mountains to the town of Apoera on the Courantyne River, to transport bauxite by river to processing plants elsewhere. The construction of this railway was financially funded by the Dutch government's independence/severance payments after November 25, 1975. After completion of this railway and associated facilities, for political and economical reasons it was never actually used and was left to be overgrown by the jungle. Also plans to construct a dam in the Kabalebo River were developed but never fully executed.

In 1984, Suralco, a subsidiary of Alcoa, formed a joint venture with the (at that time) Royal Dutch Shell-owned Billiton Company, which did not process the bauxite it mined in Suriname. Under this agreement, both companies share risks and profits.

The major mining sites at Moengo and Lelydorp are maturing, and it is now estimated that their reserves will be depleted by 2006. Other proven reserves exist in the east, west, and north of the country sufficient to last until 2045. However, distance and topography make their immediate development costly. In October 2002, Alcoa and BHP Billiton signed a letter of intent as the basis for new joint ventures between the two companies, in which Alcoa will take part for 55% in all bauxite mining activities in West Suriname. The government and the companies are looking into cost-effective ways to develop the new mines. The preeminence of bauxite and Alcoa's continued presence in Suriname is a key element in the U.S.-Suriname economic relationship.

Politics 
Suriname elected a new government in May 2000, but until it was replaced, the Wijdenbosch government continued its loose fiscal and monetary policies. By the time it left office, the exchange rate in the parallel market had depreciated further, over 10% of GDP had been borrowed to finance the fiscal deficit, and there was a significant monetary overhang in the country. The new government dealt with these problems by devaluing the official exchange rate by 88%, eliminating all other exchange rates except the parallel market rate set by the banks and cambios, raising tariffs on water and electricity, and eliminating the subsidy on gasoline. The new administration also rationalized the extensive list of price controls to 12 basic food items. More important, the government ceased all financing from the central bank. It is attempting to broaden its economic base, establish better contacts with other nations and international financial institutions, and reduce its dependence on Dutch assistance. However, to date the government has yet to implement an investment law or to begin privatization of any of the 110 parastatal, nor has it given much indication that it has developed a comprehensive plan to develop the economy.

Oil 
Oil is a promising sector. Staatsolie, the state-owned oil company, produced  a day in 2012. Staatsolie currently refines  a day at Tout Lui Faut in
the District of Wanica and is building more capacity to go to  a day.

Hardwood 
Some big companies are getting the hardwood out of the jungle. However, proposals for exploitation of the country's tropical forests and undeveloped regions of the interior traditionally inhabited by indigenous and Maroon communities have raised the concerns of environmentalists and human rights activists both in Suriname and abroad. These opposing parties are not yet strong in Suriname.

Banana 
State-owned banana producer Surland closed its doors on April 5, 2002, after its inability to meet payroll expenses for the second month in a row; it is still unclear if Surland will survive this crisis.

It was remodeled as Stichting Behoud Bananen Sector Suriname (SBBS). The rumour was that because of political differences Surland was manipulated in shutting down. The SBBS has made banana profitable for the first time in 20 years.

Other exports 
A member of CARICOM, Suriname also exports in small numbers rice, shrimp, timber, bananas, fruits, and vegetables. Fernandes Group is a soft drinks company bottled by Coca-Cola world-wide.

Currency 
Moreover, in January 2002, the government renegotiated civil servant wages (a significant part of the work force and a significant portion of government expenditure), agreeing to raises as high as 100%. Pending implementation of these wage increases and concerned that the government may be unable to meet these increased expenses, the local currency weakened from Sf 2200 in January 2002 to nearly Sf 2500 in April 2002. On March 26, 2003, the Central Bank of Suriname (CBvS) adjusted the exchange rate of the U.S. dollar. This action resulted in further devaluation of the Surinamese guilder. The official exchange rate of the US$ was SF 2,650 for selling and SF 2,600 for purchasing. With the official exchange rate, the CBvS came closer to the exchange rate on the parallel market which sold the U.S. dollar for SF 3,250.

Before 2004: Surinamese gulden (SRG) = 100 cent, SRD 1 = SRG 1000; coins had extremely low official value and a much higher collector's value; their official value has now been multiplied by 1000: the value in SRD cent is equal to the former value in SRG cent. The same applies for "currency notes" (SRG 1 and 2.50).

Surinamese guilders per US dollar - 2,346.75 (2002), 2,178.5 (2001), 1,322.47 (2000), 859.44 (1999), 401 (1998) 
Note: during 1998, the exchange rate splintered into four distinct rates; in January 1999 the government floated the guilder, but subsequently fixed it when the black-market rate plunged; the government then allowed trading within a band of SRG 500 around the official rate

Between 2004 and 2022, the value of the new Surinamese dollar (SRD) was set by the central bank. The Central Bank of Suriname spent much of Suriname's foreign currency reserves supporting the official exchange rates as inflation and other factors caused the real value of the Surinamese dollar to decline against other reserve currencies. As with the previous Surinamese guilder, the difference between the official exchange rate and the decreasing real value of the currency allowed black market currency trading to thrive. In June 2021, the central bank devalued the SRD by 33% and announced the currency would float freely. By June 2022, official exchange rates begane to reflect the real floating exchange rate.

External Debt & Restructuring 
As of February 2021, Suriname's external debt stands at US$4 billion.  Of this amount, the nation is currently seeking to restructure a total of US$675 million in loans. Suriname has retained French investment bank Lazard to act as its Financial Advisor during the restructuring.

Statistics 
The following table shows the main economic indicators in 1990–2017.

Industrial production growth rate: 6.5% (1994 est.)
Electricity – production: 1.58 billion kWh (2008)
Electricity – production by source:
Electricity – consumption: 1.44 billion kWh (2008)
exports: 0 kWh (1998)
imports: 0 kWh (1998)
Agriculture - products: paddy rice, bananas, palm kernels, coconuts, plantains, peanuts; beef, chickens; forest products; shrimp
There are no Patent Laws in Suriname.

See also 

 Surinamese dollar
 Economy of South America
 Central Bank of Suriname
 Ministry of Finance (Suriname)
 Central banks and currencies of the Caribbean
 Dutch Caribbean Securities Exchange
 List of countries by credit rating
 List of countries by public debt
 List of Latin American and Caribbean countries by GDP growth
 List of Latin American and Caribbean countries by GDP (nominal)
 List of Latin American and Caribbean countries by GDP (PPP)
 List of countries by tax revenue as percentage of GDP
 List of countries by future gross government debt
 List of countries by leading trade partners

References

External links
 With Aid and Migrants, China Expands Its Presence in a South American Nation in The New York Times by Simon Romero published April 10, 2011
 Amazon Gold Rush: Gold Mining in Suriname web map, published October 12, 2015

 
Suriname